A one-club man is a sportsman who has played his entire professional career with only one club. The term is often used in the context of team sports such as football or rugby.

Retired players
Players must have been at their club for a minimum of ten years in order to be included here. Loan spells at other teams disqualify players from being counted in the list. Only seasons with appearances in the senior first team are counted.

Active players

Active as of 14:03, 1 February 2022 (UTC). Ordered by year started, then games played. Minimum of ten years to qualify; current players who have been at their club since 2012 will be eligible for inclusion in spring 2022.

Playing and post-playing careers

In addition to those who spent their entire playing career with a single club, there are several examples of players remaining with a single club throughout their entire career within the professional club game – playing, coaching, management, etc. Notable examples are listed below.

Ilshat Aitkulov (Gazovik Orenburg): player 1990–2003; assistant 2003–2005; manager 2005; caretaker 2006, 2009, 2011.
Michael Angerschmid (SV Ried): player 1992–2006; reserves coach 2007–2012; assistant manager 2008–2012; manager 2012–present.
Michael Anhaeuser (Charleston Battery): player 1994–1998; coach 1999–present.
Joe Bacuzzi (Fulham): player 1935–1956; reserve team coach 1956–1965.
Şeref Bey (Beşiktaş): manager 1911–1925.
Edmund Białas (Lech Poznań): player 1934–1951; manager 1956–1976 with intervals.
Fred Blankemeijer (Feyenoord): player 1942–1952, technical director, board member, youth coach and scout 1940–2010.
Giampiero Boniperti (Juventus): player 1946–1961; board member 1962–1971; club president 1971–1990; CEO 1991–1994; club honorary president 2006–2021 (his death).
George Bray (Burnley): player 1937–1952; coach 1952–1974; kit manager 1974–1992.
Ross Caven (Queen's Park): player 1982–2002; director 2001–present.
Cosme Damião (Benfica): football player 1904–1916 (main squad 1907–1916); field hockey player; manager 1908–1926 (player-coach 1908–1916); director of the club's sports newspaper 1913–1931; stage director of the club's theatrical group (1916); president of the club's General Assembly 1931–1935.
Giacinto Facchetti (Inter Milan): technical director, board member, worldwide ambassador, vice president, and president 2004–2006.
Agustín Gaínza (Athletic Bilbao): player 1940–1959; reserve coach 1964–1965; head coach 1965–1968.
Boris Gavrilov (Shinnik Yaroslavl): player 1971–1989; assistant manager 1989–present.
John Greig (Rangers): player 1961–1978; manager 1978–1983; director 2003–2011; honorary life president 2015–present.
Les Hart (Bury): player 1936–1953; Coach/Physio 1954–1968; Manager 1969–1971; Physio 1972–1980.
Eddie Hunter (Queen's Park): player 1964–1974; coach 1974–1979; manager 1979–1994.
Anatoly Ilyin (Spartak Moscow): player 1949–1962; youth coach 1962–1995.
Aage Rou Jensen (AGF): player 1941–1962; manager.
Ledley King (Tottenham Hotspur): player 1999–2012; club ambassador 2012–present; assistant first team coach 2020–present.
Nat Lofthouse (Bolton Wanderers): player 1939–1960; Manager 1968–1970 and also 1971; assistant trainer 1961; chief coach 1967; chief scout; Club President 1968–2011.
Donnie McKinnon (Partick Thistle): player 1959–1973, coach/physiotherapist 1973–1989.
Gerard Meijer (Feyenoord): physiotherapist 1959–2009.
Willie Miller (Aberdeen): player 1972–1990; coach 1990–1992; manager 1992–1995; director of football 2004–2012.
Bill Nicholson (Tottenham Hotspur): player 1938–1955; manager 1958–1974.
Bob Paisley (Liverpool): player 1939–1954; coach/physiotherapist 1954–1959; assistant manager 1959–1974; manager 1974–1983.
Carles Puyol (Barcelona): player 1999–2014; assistant director of football 2014 (resigned the same year).
Roman Rogocz (Lechia Gdańsk): player 1947–1962; manager and youth team manager 1962–1975 with intervals.
Hussein Saeed (Al-Talaba): player 1975–1990; manager 1992; vice-president 1985–1992.
Ali Sami Yen (Galatasaray): player 1905–1909; manager 1916–1917; club president 1905–1918 and 1925.
Süleyman Seba (Beşiktaş): player 1946–1953; club president 1984–2000.
Vadym Sosnykhin (Dynamo Kyiv): player 1960–1973; youth-team coach 1974–1991; veterans team director 1992–2003.
Roy Sproson (Port Vale): player 1949–1972 and manager 1974–1977.
George Stevenson (Motherwell): player 1923–1939; manager 1946–1955.
Lajos Tichy (Budapest Honvéd): player 1953–1971; manager 1976–1982.
Andriy Tsvik (Stal Alchevsk): player 1987–2005; reserves coach 2005–2007; assistant manager 2007–present.
Josu Urrutia (Athletic Bilbao): player 1987–2003; club president 2011–2018.
Antoon Verlegh (NAC Breda): player 1912–1931; manager, chairman, chairman of honour 1931–1960.
Heinz Wewers (Rot-Weiss Essen): player 1949–1962; runner of stadium pub 1957–approx.1962; manager 1967.
John Stewart Wright (Greenock Morton): player 1911–1924; manager 1927–1929 and 1934–1939.
Lev Yashin (Dynamo Moscow): player 1949–1971; club administration 1971–1990.
Hakkı Yeten (Beşiktaş): player 1931–1948; manager 1949 and 1950–1951; club president 1960–1963, 1964–1966 and 1967–1968.
Michael Zorc (Borussia Dortmund): player 1981–1998; general manager of football 1998–present.
Kenneth Ohlsson (Hammarby IF): player 1966–1983; coach 1989–1992.
Paolo Maldini (A.C. Milan): player 1984–2009; sporting strategy and development director 2018–2019; technical director 2019–present

See also
 List of one-club men in rugby league
 List of Major League Baseball players who spent their entire career with one franchise
 List of National Football League players who spent their entire career with one franchise
 List of NBA players who have spent their entire career with one franchise
 List of NHL players who spent their entire career with one franchise
 One Club Award (Athletic Bilbao)

Notes

References

Lists of association football players
Association football